Kinga Rajda (born 22 December 2000) is a Polish ski jumper. She is a member of the national team, a two-time Polish Champion (2015, 2016) and competed at the 2019 World Championships.

On 30 January 2016 in Oberstdorf, after jumping to 86.5 and 83.0 meters, she took 30th place in the World Cup competition, thus becoming the second female Polish ski jumper in history (after Magdalena Pałasz), who scored points in this competition.

On 2 March 2019, she took part in the mixed team, alongside Kamil Stoch, Dawid Kubacki and Kamila Karpiel, at the 2019 World Championships, it was Poland's debut in the mixed team at World Championships. The Polish mixed team was surprisingly in third after the first round and took 6th place at the end.

World Championships

World Junior Championships

World Cup

Season standings

Continental Cup

Season standings

References

External links
 

2000 births
Living people
Polish female ski jumpers
Sportspeople from Silesian Voivodeship
People from Bielsko County
Ski jumpers at the 2016 Winter Youth Olympics
Ski jumpers at the 2022 Winter Olympics
Olympic ski jumpers of Poland
Competitors at the 2023 Winter World University Games
Medalists at the 2023 Winter World University Games
21st-century Polish women
Universiade medalists in nordic combined
Universiade gold medalists for Poland
Universiade bronze medalists for Poland